Urban is a ghost town in Custer County, in the U.S. state of South Dakota.

History
The town of Urban was named after the hope that it would become something "pertaining to a city"(i.e. comparable to a city).

References

Geography of Custer County, South Dakota
Ghost towns in South Dakota